KQBK (104.7 FM) is a radio station broadcasting a classic hits format. Licensed to Waldron, Arkansas, United States, it serves the Ft. Smith, Arkansas, area. The station is currently owned by Pharis Broadcasting, Inc.

References

External links

QBK
Classic hits radio stations in the United States